Long Live the Queen may refer to:

 "The king is dead, long live the king!", proclamation made following the accession of a new monarch
 Long Live the Queen (film), a 1995 Dutch film
 "Long Live The Queen" (song), a song by UK singer-songwriter Frank Turner
 "Long Live the Queen" (Charmed), an episode of the television series Charmed
 Long Live the Queen (video game), a 2012 PC video game by Hanako Games
 "Long Live the Queen", an episode from The Legend of Korra TV series

See also
Long Live the Queens!, an album by British pop music duo Shakespears Sister